Benjamin Köhler (born 4 August 1980) is a German former professional footballer. Köhler, who is left-footed, could play flexibly on all offensive positions but often found himself on the left wing.

Career
After getting just one appearance with Hertha BSC he had a one-year loan stint with Duisburg; he finally moved to Regionalliga side Rot-Weiss Essen where he scored 13 goals. After that season, Eintracht Frankfurt scouted and finally signed him. In the promotion season he netted seven goals in 29 games. In the next season he had as many games while scoring three goals, one of which was among the goal of the week choices.

On 7 February 2015, his Union Berlin team-mates held a tribute to him in support after his diagnosis of stomach cancer after the seventh minute of the game, a 2–1 defeat of VfL Bochum. They received an ovation from both the fans and players from both teams. His contract was later renewed, even after the diagnosis. In July 2015 it was announced that he had beaten stomach cancer and he was given the all clear.

At the end of his contract in summer 2017, Köhler's contract at Union Berlin was not renewed; moreover, he decided to put an end to his career because of knee issues.

References

External links
 
 
 Benjamin Köhler at eintracht-archiv.de 

1980 births
Living people
People from Reinickendorf
German footballers
Footballers from Berlin
Association football midfielders
Germany under-21 international footballers
2. Bundesliga players
Bundesliga players
Füchse Berlin Reinickendorf players
Hertha BSC players
Hertha BSC II players
MSV Duisburg players
Rot-Weiss Essen players
Eintracht Frankfurt players
1. FC Kaiserslautern players
1. FC Union Berlin players